Antonio Zappulla is the CEO of the Thomson Reuters Foundation, the corporate foundation of Thomson Reuters. The foundation is an independent charity registered in the UK and the US.

Education
Zappulla has a Master's degree in Islam and Middle East studies, as well as a Bachelor's degree in Journalism.

Career
Zappulla previously worked at Bloomberg Television, where he managed the development and production of global programming. He became CEO of Thomson Reuters Foundation in April 2019 after working at the foundation for six years.

Zappulla also founded Openly as the first LGBT+ global news platform that distributes to Reuters.

Opinions and advocacy
During the COVID-19 pandemic, Zappulla has advocated for fair, accurate and independent reporting, stressing that the national stability of many countries depends on quality journalism and press freedom. In addition, he is an advocate for the beneficial use of modern technology and "big data" to achieve positive social impact, and believes that NGOs should leverage technology use to gain public trust.

As a strong supporter of human rights, Zappulla has stressed that healthcare should be a global human right and is essential for fighting against global epidemics.

Zappulla also identifies as LGBT and has advocated for LGBT civil rights.

References

Living people
Italian LGBT businesspeople
Thomson Reuters people
Year of birth missing (living people)
21st-century Italian LGBT people